The Battle of Tetuán was fought on 4 to 6 February 1860, near Tetuán, Morocco, between a Spanish army sent to North Africa and the tribal levies which at the time made up the Moroccan Army. The battle was part of the Spanish-Moroccan War of 1859–1860.

Background
The Spanish expeditionary force, which departed from Algeciras, was composed of 36,000 men, 65 pieces of artillery, and 41 ships, which included steamships, sailboats, and smaller vessels. General Leopoldo O'Donnell personally took charge of the expedition and divided these forces into three corps. These were commanded by General The 5th Marqués de Torreblanca, General Antonio Ros de Olano and General Ramón de Echagüe. Reserves were placed under the command of General The 1st Conde de Reus. Admiral Segundo Díaz Herrero commanded the fleet. The objective of the Spanish forces was to take Tetuán, which had served as a base for raids on Ceuta and Melilla.

Hostilities between Moroccan and Spanish troops began on 17 December 1859 when the column commanded by The Marqués de Torreblanca occupied the Sierra de Bullones. On 19 December, Echagüe captured the Palacio del Serrallo. The Conde de Lucena commanded a force that landed at Ceuta on 21 December. By Christmas Day, the three columns had consolidated their positions and awaited orders to advance towards Tetuán.

Battle 
On 1 January 1860, the Conde de Reus advanced towards the port of Guad al Gelu. The Marqués de Torreblanca’s column and the Royal Spanish Navy guarded his flank. Clashes continued until 31 January 1860, when a major Moroccan offensive was stopped. The Conde de Lucena began a march towards the objective of Tetuán, and was supported by forces composed of Catalan volunteers. Covering fire was provided by units commanded by General The Conde de Reus and General Ros de Olano. Spanish artillery inflicted heavy losses on the Moroccan ranks; the Moroccan forces that remained took refuge in Tetuán. The city fell on 6 February 1860. A week of further fighting followed before hostilities ceased.

Aftermath
The capture of Tetuán prevented further attacks on Ceuta and Melilla by Moroccan forces. The Conde de Lucena returned with his troops to Spain; they camped at a spot north of Madrid while a triumphal entry into the capital was arranged. The camp, which acquired permanent structures as well as shops over time, became the Madrid neighbourhood known as Tetuán de las Victorias. In the aftermath of the battle, General Leopoldo O'Donnell, 1st Conde de Lucena, was elevated in the Spanish peerage to being The 1st Duque de Tetuán. He later served as President of the Council of Ministers (also known as the Prime Minister).

Cultural references

Salvador Dalí painted a version of Fortuny’s painting of the battle. 

The Spanish victory was carved and painted on the pediment of the Church of San Joaquín, Iloilo, considered a militarist-themed church in the Philippines. It was declared a national historical site in 1974. It was built in 1859 and completed in 1869 by the Spanish friar Tomas Santaren of the Augustinian Order.

Gallery

References

External links

 Portal Fuenterebollo
 (World History at KMLA)
 Moroccan War 1859-1860
 Battle of Tetuan bas-relief on Philippine church

Tétouan
Tetuan, Battle of
Tetuan, Battle of
Tetuan
1860 in Morocco
19th century in Morocco
History of Tétouan
Hispano-Moroccan War (1859–60)